9XI may refer to:

 KUOM, a college radio station operated by the University of Minnesota Twin Cities
 Minolta 9xi, a 35mm SLR camera designed and manufactured by Minolta